Yujiulü Poluomen was a khagan of Rouran with the title Mioukesheju Khagan (彌偶可社句可汗). He was a grandson of Yujiulü Nagai and a cousin of Yujiulü Anagui.

Reign 
He proclaimed himself khagan after coup against Yujiulü Anagui by Qilifa Shifa (俟力发示发). Having lost the fight, Anagui fled to Northern Wei. Emperor Xiaoming sheltered him and ordered his advisors to bring him to palace, using the opportunity. The Chinese court sent an ambassador who was to find out Poluomen’s intentions and urge him to accept Anagui as his vassal. Poluomen did not speak with the ambassador, who refused to give him honor as a sovereign lord.

Soon, unrest began again in Rouran, Qilifa Shifa this time marched against him. Gaoche took advantage of it and attacked Poluomen. Khagan was forced to transfer the capital to Liangzhou (Central Gansu) and asked to accept Wei overlordship. On the whole, as Poluomen lost power over the Rouran and several nobles started to contest against each other. Northern Wei solved the problem by partitioning Rouran between Poluomen and Anagui. Anagui resided in Huaishuo (modern Guyang, Inner Mongolia), while Poluomen ruled from Xihai (modern Ejin, Inner Mongolia).

Later in 522 Poluomen decided to flee with his soldiers to Hephtalite relatives, but the Chinese troops arrested him and in 522 took him to Luoyang, where he would live under the house arrest in the Lonananguan Palace, where he died in 525.

He was posthumously created Duke Guangmu (广牧公).

Sources 

 History of the Northern Dynasties, vol. 86.
 Book of Wei, vol. 103

References 

525 deaths
Khagans of the Rouran